Frank Aron Booker  (born 7 July 1994) is an American-Icelandic basketball player who plays for the Úrvalsdeild karla club Valur. In 2019, he debuted with the Icelandic national basketball team.

Early life
Booker was born in Reykjavík, Iceland, to Frank Booker, an American professional basketball player who was drafted by the New Jersey Nets in 1987, and Icelander Þórunn Jónsdóttir. He grew up in Iceland until the age of 11 when he moved to his father in Augusta, Georgia to attend school. At Westside High School in Augusta, Booker averaged 27.9 points and 4.1 assists per game as a senior.

College career
Booker attended the University of Oklahoma from 2013 to 2015, where he backed up Buddy Hield. On 22 May 2015, he scored 12 points in Oklahoma's victory against Dayton in the second round of the 2015 NCAA tournament. He transferred to Florida Atlantic in 2015 and redshirted his first year while undergoing a back surgery to repair a herniated disc. In 2016–2017, Booker averaged 5.7 points and 16.7 minutes per game for the Owls. Prior to his senior year, Booker transferred to South Carolina for the 2017–18 season. In 33 games for the Gamecocks, Booker averaged 12.7 points while shooting 40,9% from the three point range.

Club career
In July 2018, Booker signed with ALM Évreux of the French LNB Pro B. In 29 games for the team, he averaged 8.7 points in 21.6 minutes per game.

On 29 August 2019, Booker signed with Úrvalsdeild karla club Valur, the same team his father played for from 1991 to 1994 and led to the Úrvalsdeild Finals in 1992. After a rough debut where he scored 7 points on a dismissal 2 of 14 shooting in a narrow win against Fjölnir, Booker bounced back in his second game, scoring a team high 25 points and connecting on six of his three point shots in a victory against Þór Þorlákshöfn. Booker averaged 15.3 points, 3.7 rebounds, 2.3 assists and 1.6 steals per game in 2019-20.

After sitting out the first half of the 2021–2022 season due to injury, Booker signed with Breiðablik in January 2022. He appeared in 10 games for Breiðablik, averaging 6.1 points and 2.6 rebounds per game.

In September 2022, Booker signed back with Valur. On 2 October 2022, he won the Icelandic Super Cup with Valur. On 14 January 2023, he won the Icelandic Cup with Valur after the team defeated Stjarnan in the Cup final.

National team career
Booker was invited by Icelandic national team coach Craig Pedersen to attend training camp prior to Iceland's EuroBasket 2015 qualification but could not attend due to commitments to Oklahoma. In July 2019, he was selected to Iceland's 15-man roster ahead of its games against Portugal and Switzerland in the EuroBasket 2021 qualification. He played his first game in a 1-point loss against Portugal on 8 August, scoring 2 points.

References

External links
South Carolina profile
Oklahoma profile
Frank Booker at realgm.com
Frank Booker at sports-reference.com
LNB Pro B statistics at lnb.fr
Eurobasket profile at fiba.basketball
Icelandic statistics at Icelandic Basketball Association

1994 births
Living people
American men's basketball players
American expatriate basketball people in France
American expatriate basketball people in Iceland
Frank Booker
Florida Atlantic Owls men's basketball players
Guards (basketball)
Frank Booker
Frank Booker
Frank Booker
Oklahoma Sooners men's basketball players
South Carolina Gamecocks men's basketball players
Frank Booker